A snapsvisa (Swedish, plural: snapsvisor) is a traditional Scandinavian  drinking song, which is often sung before drinking a small shot of spirit that is called a snaps.

A typical snapsvisa is a short, vigorous song; its lyrics usually tell of the delicacy and glory of the drink, or of the singer’s craving for snaps. Snapsvisor are short, bright, and easy to learn. The most well-known snapsvisa in Sweden is Helan Går.

Snapsvisor are an important part of traditional and family festivities in Sweden, Norway, Denmark, and among Swedish-speaking Finns. The singing of these drinking songs is also a lively part of Scandinavian student culture. In some cases universities even have detailed explanations for foreign students on how to sing during formal dinners. They are also widespread among monolingually Finnish students in Finland, although they are rarely met with elsewhere in Finnish drinking culture.

See also 
Drinking culture
Drinking song
Snaps
Helan går

References

External links
Drinking song – snapsvisa
Drinking songs at The Historical Museum of Wines and Spirits

Drinking songs
Alcohol in Sweden
Swedish folk songs
Songs about alcohol